Northern Pomo is a critically endangered Pomoan language, spoken by the indigenous Pomo people in what is now called California. The speakers of Northern Pomo were traditionally those who lived in the northern and largest area of the Pomoan territory.  Other communities near to the Pomo were the Coast Yuki, the Huchnom, and the Athabascan. Ukiah High School first began offering Northern Pomo in the Fall 2020.

Classification
Northern Pomo falls under the Western branch of the Pomoan language family, and it is the only language categorized in this branch that is not part of the Southern group.

History
The earliest noted documentation of Native Americans in this area was by General Drake in 1579, but it cannot be certain that the people he encountered were what is now considered to be the Pomo.  A census was delivered of the people in this area by Colonel Redick M'Kee during an expedition in 1851 putting the Pomo at roughly 1000-1200 people.  The language was not documented during either encounters.

Later expeditions by John Wesley Powell in 1891 and Samuel Barrett in 1908 would record accounts of the language family and its branches.

Geographic Distribution
Northern Pomo was spoken in the United States of America in the northern coastal area of California.  The Pomo inhabited a massive amount of territory north of the San Francisco Bay and surrounding Clear Lake in northern California, USA. According to the 2010 United States Census, there are 10,308 Pomo people in the United States. Of these, 8,578 reside in California.

Branches and Subgroups
There are seven different Pomoan languages:
 Northern Pomo
 Northeastern Pomo
 Eastern Pomo
 Central Pomo
 Southern Pomo
 Southeastern Pomo
 Kashaya (Southwestern) Pomo

Grammar

Relational Terminology
Northern Pomo normally avoids the use of birth names in conversation, instead using relational terminology such as father, mother, sister, etc. This is especially present in the case of a deceased family member.  The avoidance of names is why third person referencing is prevalent in Pomoan speech.  If the deceased family member was close to the speaker, they will not speak their name even if a living relative shares that name.  Any speaking partner is expected to avoid these names so that the speaker does not hear it.  It is seen as a disrespect to their relationship with the deceased.  More casual speakers may mention the names of the deceased in conversation that they are not related to.

Possessive Terminology
Northern Pomo switches between regular possession and possessor raising depending upon the term the speaker wants to focus upon.  In a regular possession situation, the subject of the sentence remains the focus, whereas with possessor raising the object or person being possessed becomes the focus of the sentence. Depending on which construction is used in Northern Pomo the implications of a given sentence would change.  Sentences with possessor raising constructions imply consequences in Northern Pomo, such as the consequences of a possessor affecting a body part or having a certain physical trait.

Phonology

Allophones of /kʰ, t͡sʼ/ include [x, sʼ].

See also
 Pomoan languages
 Pomo people

References

Further reading
 Golla, Victor. (2011). California indian languages. Berkeley: U of California. Berkeley and Los Angeles, California.
 Golla, Victor. Moseley, Christoper ed. (2007). North America. In: Encyclopedia of the world’s endangered languages, (1–96). London & New York: Routledge.
McLendon, Sarah. Klar, Kathryn ed. Scott Beeler, Madison ed. Langdon, Margaret ed. Silver Shirley ed. (1980). How Languages Die: A Social History of Unstable Bilingualism among the Eastern Pomo. American Indian and Indoeuropean Studies: Papers in Honor of Madison S. Beeler. The Hague: Mouton. N. pag. Print.
 Mithun, Marianne. (1999). The languages of Native North America. Cambridge: Cambridge University Press.  (hbk); .
 O'Connor, Mary Catherine. (1990). Topics in Northern Pomo Grammar. Outstanding Dissertations in Linguistics. Garland Press.

External links
 Vocabulary Words in Native American Languages: Pomo
 Field recordings of Northern Pomo conducted by Eero Vihman with Edna Guerrero
 Northern Pomo language overview at the Survey of California and Other Indian Languages
 Northern Pomo basic lexicon at the Global Lexicostatistical Database
 OLAC resources in and about the Northern Pomo language
 Northern Pomo Language Tools

Pomoan languages
Indigenous languages of California
Extinct languages of North America
Pomo tribe
Languages extinct in the 2000s